Guy Forget and Yannick Noah were the defending champions, but none competed this year.

Jorge Lozano and Todd Witsken won the title, by defeating Pieter Aldrich and Danie Visser 6–3, 7–6 in the final.

Seeds

Draw

Finals

Top half

Bottom half

References

External links
 Official results archive (ATP)
 Official results archive (ITF)

World Championship Tennis Tournament of Champions
1988 Grand Prix (tennis)